Fodina pallula is a moth of the family Noctuidae first described by Achille Guenée in 1852. It is found in India and Sri Lanka.

Adults are robust and the wings strikingly marked. Forewings are dark brownish with an oblique white bar dividing them from the center of the costa to the tornus. A finely banded pale brown to whitish marginal zone can be seen. Hindwings are usually yellow with a dark brown border that is broadest around the apex. Antennae filiform (thread like) in males. The caterpillar is pale greenish with paradorsal white lines and some dorsal white spots. Pupation is in the soil made in a thin cocoon. Pupa lacks a bloom. Caterpillars are known to feed on Holarrhena, Tabernaemontana and Vallaris solanacea.

References

Moths of Asia
Moths described in 1852